The 2018–19 season was the first season in the top Ukrainian football league for FC Arsenal Kyiv since its reformation in 2014. Arsenal competed in the Premier League and the Ukrainian Cup.

Players

Squad information

Transfers

In

Out

Pre-season and friendlies

Competitions

Overall

Premier League

League table

Results summary

Results by round

Matches

Ukrainian Cup

Statistics

Appearances and goals

|-
! colspan=16 style=background:#dcdcdc; text-align:center| Goalkeepers

|-
! colspan=16 style=background:#dcdcdc; text-align:center| Defenders

|-
! colspan=16 style=background:#dcdcdc; text-align:center| Midfielders 

|-
! colspan=16 style=background:#dcdcdc; text-align:center| Forwards

|-
! colspan=16 style=background:#dcdcdc; text-align:center| Players transferred out during the season

Last updated: 31 May 2019

Goalscorers

Last updated: 31 May 2019

Clean sheets

Last updated: 31 May 2019

Disciplinary record

Last updated: 31 May 2019

References

External links
 Official website 

FC Arsenal Kyiv seasons
Arsenal Kyiv